Narayanpur is one of the 90 Legislative Assembly constituencies of Chhattisgarh state in India. It is in Narayanpur district and is reserved for candidates belonging to the Scheduled Tribes. It forms a part of the Lok Sabha constituency of Bastar.

Members of the Legislative Assembly

Election results

2018

See also
List of constituencies of the Chhattisgarh Legislative Assembly
Narayanpur district

References

Narayanpur district
Assembly constituencies of Chhattisgarh